An imaginary friend is an invented person, animal or character

Imaginary Friend or Imaginary Friends may also refer to:

Music
 Imaginary Friend (Th' Faith Healers album), 1993
 Imaginary Friends (Freezepop album), 2010
 "Imaginary Friends", a 2009 song by Zeromancer from Sinners International
 "Imaginary Friends", a 2016 song by Deadmau5 from W:/2016Album/
 Los Amigos Invisibles ("The Invisible Friends"), a Venezuelan band

Film and television
 "Imaginary Friend" (Star Trek: The Next Generation), a 1992 episode of Star Trek: The Next Generation
 "Imaginary Friend" (The Nanny), a 1993 episode of The Nanny
 Imaginary Friend (film), a 2012 Lifetime television movie starring Lacey Chabert

Other uses
 Imaginary Friends (play), a 2002 play by Nora Ephron
 Imaginary Friend, a 2006 film starring Abigail Breslin
 Imaginary Friends, a 1967 novel by Alison Lurie
 Imaginary Friend (novel), a 2019 novel by Stephen Chbosky

See also
 Foster's Home for Imaginary Friends, a television series